{{DISPLAYTITLE:C16H14O3}}
The molecular formula C16H14O3 (molar mass: 254.28 g/mol, exact mass: 254.094294 u) may refer to:

 Chalepensin
 Dalbergichromene
 Dexketoprofen
 Fenbufen
 Ketoprofen

Molecular formulas